The Capital Area Loop Expressway is an orbital expressway encircling the city of Beijing. It is designated G95. The road was completed in December 2016. Colloquially, the road is also referred to as Beijing's 7th ring road, though only  of the expressway runs through Beijing, compared to  through Tianjin and  through Hebei.

History
In 2022, this expressway was officially rerouted so that it does not enter Beijing's municipality.

Route
This expressway encircles the various counties and cities that surround the city centre of Beijing, including Zhangjiakou,  Langfang, and Chengde in Hebei Province, and Daxing District, Tongzhou District and Pinggu District in Beijing.

References

Chinese national-level expressways
Expressways in Hebei
Ring roads in China